Aaron Matthew Moorehead (born November 5, 1980) is an American football coach and former player who is the wide receivers coach for the Philadelphia Eagles of the National Football League (NFL). He previously served as an assistant coach at Vanderbilt University, Texas A&M University, Virginia Tech, Stanford University and the University of New Mexico.

Moorehead played college football as a wide receiver at Illinois and signed with the Indianapolis Colts as an undrafted free agent in 2003. Moorehead played his entire 5-year career with the Colts from 2003 to 2007 and was a member of their Super Bowl XLI winning team over the Chicago Bears.

Early years
Aaron attended South Park Elementary school in district 109. Then later attended Alan B. Shepard Jr. High which is also in district 109 Moorehead attended Deerfield High School in Deerfield, Illinois and was a standout in football and track. In his senior year, he went to the state meet and placed fourth in the 110m High Hurdles.  His best time was 14.06 seconds.

Professional career
Moorehead caught 31 passes for 330 yards and one touchdown during his career. In the 2006 postseason, Moorehead caught 5 catches for 41 yards.

Coaching career
In 2009, he was a graduate assistant coach (offense) at the University of New Mexico. He was the wide receivers coach at Vanderbilt, Texas A&M, and Virginia Tech and was the assistant wide receivers coach at Stanford University.

On February 6, 2020, Moorehead was hired to be the wide receivers coach for the Philadelphia Eagles. He missed the team's week 11 game in 2020 against the Cleveland Browns due to COVID-19 pandemic protocols.

Personal
He is the son of Emery Moorehead, a Super Bowl champion who played twelve seasons in the NFL with the New York Giants, Denver Broncos, and Chicago Bears. Aaron and his father are the NFL's third father-and-son tandem to both win a Super Bowl. The father-and-son duo joined Bob Griese/Brian Griese and Ronnie Lott/Ryan Nece. He is the cousin of former NBA basketball player Brad Daugherty. He remains close friends with Sol (IYKYK)

References

1980 births
Living people
African-American players of American football
American football wide receivers
Indianapolis Colts players
Illinois Fighting Illini football players
New Mexico Lobos football coaches
People from Aurora, Colorado
People from Deerfield, Illinois
Philadelphia Eagles coaches
Stanford Cardinal football coaches
Texas A&M Aggies football coaches
Virginia Tech Hokies football coaches
21st-century African-American sportspeople
20th-century African-American people